The Chairman Dances is a 1985 composition by John Adams, subtitled Foxtrot for Orchestra and lasting about 13 minutes. A commission from the Milwaukee Symphony Orchestra, it has several dance-like tunes and has been described by Adams as an “outtake” from Act III of the opera he was working on at the time, Nixon in China. The word “Dances” in the title is a verb, not a noun. In the opera, the music depicts Madame Mao gate-crashing a presidential banquet, hanging paper lanterns, and performing a seductive dance; Chairman Mao descends from his portrait, and the two dance a foxtrot, back in time together. The piece ends with the sound of a gramophone winding down.

The Chairman Dances was used in the Civilization IV and I Am Love soundtracks.

Instrumentation
The work is scored for a large orchestra.

Woodwinds
2 flutes, both doubling piccolo
2 oboes
2 clarinets in B, second doubling bass clarinet
2 bassoons

Brass
4 horns in F
2 trumpets in B
2 tenor trombones
tuba

Percussion
glockenspiel
vibraphone
xylophone
crotales
sandpaper blocks
wood blocks, high and medium
crash cymbal
hi-hat
suspended cymbal
sizzle cymbal, suspended
claves
bell tree
triangle
tambourine
castanets
snare drum
pedal bass drum
timpani

Keyboards
piano

Strings
harp
string section

References

External links
Sound Clip of The Chairman Dances, and John Adams' Program Notes

Compositions by John Adams (composer)
1985 compositions
Compositions for symphony orchestra
Music commissioned by the Milwaukee Symphony Orchestra